is a Japanese politician of the Social Democratic Party, a member of the House of Representatives in the Diet (national legislature).

A native of Kesennuma, Miyagi and high school graduate, he joined Toshiba in 1968. After having served for four terms in the city assembly of Kesennuma since 1985, he ran unsuccessfully for the House of Representatives in February 2000. He ran again in June of the same year and was elected for the first time. Losing his seat in 2003, he ran unsuccessfully for the House of Councilors in the Diet in 2004. He was re-elected to the House of Representatives in 2005.

References

External links 
  in Japanese.

Members of the House of Representatives (Japan)
People from Kesennuma, Miyagi
Japanese municipal councilors
Politicians from Miyagi Prefecture
Living people
1948 births
Social Democratic Party (Japan) politicians
21st-century Japanese politicians